Yussef Faraj Al-Suwayed (born 20 September 1958) is a Kuwaiti football midfielder who played for Kuwait in the 1982 FIFA World Cup. He also played for Kazma Sporting Club.

References

External links
FIFA profile

1958 births
Kuwaiti footballers
Kuwait international footballers
Association football midfielders
1980 AFC Asian Cup players
1982 FIFA World Cup players
1984 AFC Asian Cup players
Living people
Olympic footballers of Kuwait
Footballers at the 1980 Summer Olympics
Asian Games medalists in football
Footballers at the 1982 Asian Games
Footballers at the 1986 Asian Games
AFC Asian Cup-winning players
Asian Games silver medalists for Kuwait
Asian Games bronze medalists for Kuwait
Medalists at the 1982 Asian Games
Medalists at the 1986 Asian Games
Kazma SC players
Kuwait Premier League players